Dobrovolskiy is a small lunar impact crater on the Moon's far side. The northwest part of its rim is intruded upon by the somewhat larger crater Shirakatsi, and the outer rampart of that feature covers most of the interior floor of Dobrovolskiy. Very little of the original floor now survives, with a small section near the southern inner wall. The remainder of the crater rim is somewhat circular and only mildly worn.

To the north the southern rim of the much larger crater Perepelkin is intruded upon by Shirakatsi, and the three form a brief, curving crater chain. To the southeast of Dobrovolskiy is the crater Volkov.

It is named after cosmonaut Georgiy T. Dobrovolskiy, who died during the Soyuz 11 mission.

Satellite craters
By convention these features are identified on lunar maps by placing the letter on the side of the crater midpoint that is closest to Dobrovolskiy.

Views

External links
 Figure 148 in Chapter 5 of APOLLO OVER THE MOON: A View From Orbit (NASA SP-362, 1978) shows an oblique closeup of Shirakatsi and Dobrovolskiy (although they are not named)

References

 
 
 
 
 
 
 
 
 
 
 
 

Impact craters on the Moon